Andrzej Białynicki-Birula (26 December 1935 – 19 April 2021) was a Polish mathematician, best known for his work on algebraic geometry. He was considered one of the pioneers of differential algebra. He was a member of the Polish Academy of Sciences.

Białynicki-Birula was born in Nowogrodek, Polish Republic, currently known as Navahrudak, West Belarus. His elder brother, was born two years earlier and is a theoretical physicist and a fellow member of the Polish Academy of Sciences. He received his Ph.D. from the University of California, Berkeley in 1960. His thesis was written under the direction of Gerhard Hochschild. Since 1970, he was Professor of Mathematics at Warsaw University.

See also
List of Polish mathematicians

References

External links
Home page at Warsaw University

1935 births
2021 deaths
20th-century Polish mathematicians
21st-century Polish mathematicians
Algebraic geometers
University of California, Berkeley alumni
Academic staff of the University of Warsaw
Members of the Polish Academy of Sciences
People from Nowogródek Voivodeship (1919–1939)